Perry County is a county located in the U.S. state of Mississippi. As of the 2020 census, the population was 11,511. The county seat is New Augusta. The county is named after the War of 1812 naval hero, Oliver Hazard Perry.

Perry County is part of the Hattiesburg, MS Metropolitan Statistical Area.

Until 1906, the county seat was the old town of Augusta, near the center of the county on the east bank of the Leaf River. At Old Augusta, the outlaw James Copeland was executed by hanging on October 30, 1857.  Old Augusta remains a small village today.  New Augusta, two miles south of Old Augusta, was made the county seat of Perry County, because it was situated on the Mobile, Jackson & Kansas City Railroad.

Geography

Major highways
  U.S. Highway 98
  Mississippi Highway 15
  Mississippi Highway 29
  Mississippi Highway 42

Adjacent counties
 Wayne County (northeast)
 Greene County (east)
 George County (southeast)
 Stone County (south)
 Forrest County (west)
 Jones County (northwest)

National protected area
 De Soto National Forest (part)
 Black Creek Wilderness
 Leaf River Wildlife Management Area

Demographics

2020 census

As of the 2020 United States census, there were 11,511 people, 4,623 households, and 3,347 families residing in the county.

2000 census
As of the census of 2000, there were 12,138 people, 4,420 households, and 3,332 families residing in the county.  The population density was 19 people per square mile (7/km2).  There were 5,107 housing units at an average density of 8 per square mile (3/km2).  The racial makeup of the county was 76.17% White, 22.59% Black or African American, 0.33% Native American, 0.12% Asian, 0.05% Pacific Islander, 0.28% from other races, and 0.47% from two or more races.  1.01% of the population were Hispanic or Latino of any race.

There were 4,420 households, out of which 37.60% had children under the age of 18 living with them, 58.10% were married couples living together, 13.20% had a female householder with no husband present, and 24.60% were non-families. 21.90% of all households were made up of individuals, and 8.70% had someone living alone who was 65 years of age or older.  The average household size was 2.72 and the average family size was 3.18.

In the county, the population was spread out, with 28.70% under the age of 18, 10.00% from 18 to 24, 28.00% from 25 to 44, 22.20% from 45 to 64, and 11.10% who were 65 years of age or older.  The median age was 34 years. For every 100 females, there were 95.60 males.  For every 100 females age 18 and over, there were 91.10 males.

The median income for a household in the county was $27,189, and the median income for a family was $32,791. Males had a median income of $29,130 versus $18,632 for females. The per capita income for the county was $12,837.  About 19.60% of families and 22.00% of the population were below the poverty line, including 28.60% of those under age 18 and 25.50% of those age 65 or over.

Communities

Towns
 Beaumont
 New Augusta (county seat)
 Richton

Census-designated place
 Runnelstown

Unincorporated communities
 Corinth
 Good Hope
 Hintonville
 Janice
 Mahned
 Tallahala
 Wingate

Notable people
 Swords Lee, timber owner and member of the Louisiana House of Representatives for Grant Parish, 1904–1908; born in Perry County in 1859

Politics

See also
 National Register of Historic Places listings in Perry County, Mississippi

References

 
Mississippi counties
Hattiesburg metropolitan area
1820 establishments in Mississippi
Populated places established in 1820